The term "early warning" may refer to

Warning system
Airborne early warning and control
Early warning system
Early Warning (Baby Animals song)
Early Warning Services (financial company), a company that owns clearXchange
Early-warning radar
Early Warning (novel), a book by Jane Smiley